Thaddeus Charles Young Sr. (born June 21, 1988) is an American professional basketball player for the Toronto Raptors of the National Basketball Association (NBA). He played college basketball for Georgia Tech, before being drafted 12th overall in the 2007 NBA draft by the Philadelphia 76ers.

Early life
Young was born to Lula Hall and Felton Young in New Orleans, Louisiana. His family moved to Memphis, Tennessee when Young was in fourth grade. His father played basketball for Jacksonville University from 1976 to 1978, and was selected by the Buffalo Braves in the 8th round of the 1978 NBA draft.

High school career
Young began playing varsity basketball in the eighth grade, and while attending Mitchell High School, he rose to the top of the high school player rungs. His athletic honors included being named to the all-state team three times, being named the TSSAA Class AA "Mr. Basketball" in 2005, being named the 2006 Tennessee Gatorade Player of the Year and being named to the McDonald's High School All-American Team. In 2006, he led Mitchell's basketball team to the TSSAA Class AA finals against Liberty Technology Magnet High School. As a senior, he averaged 26.9 points, 13.8 rebounds, 4.1 assists, 4.3 steals and 3.6 blocks per game. He was an excellent overall athlete at Mitchell who also excelled in cross country in his junior year. Young was an exceptional student at Mitchell who graduated with a 4.3 GPA. Coming out of high school Young was one of the most prized recruits of the 2006 freshman class.

College career
Young was the youngest member of Georgia Tech's 2006 freshman class. Young finished his freshman season with averages of 14.4 points, 4.9 rebounds, and 2.2 assists. He shot a solid 47.8% from the field and an above average 41.9% from the three-point line.

Professional career

Philadelphia 76ers (2007–2014)

On June 28, 2007, Young was drafted by the Philadelphia 76ers with the 12th overall pick in the 2007 NBA draft.

In his NBA debut on November 7, 2007, Young made his first NBA field goal at the Wachovia Center in Philadelphia in a 94–63 76ers' win over the Charlotte Bobcats. Young finished the night with 6 points and 3 rebounds.

Until general manager Ed Stefanski was hired, Young did not play very often. After the trade of Kyle Korver, Young played more minutes and alternated with Reggie Evans in the starting lineup. Young averaged 8.2 points, 4.2 rebounds, and 21 minutes per game during 2007–08. His season high in points was 22 against the Milwaukee Bucks on March 9, 2008. He played a total of 74 games, starting 22.

On February 5, 2009, Young was selected to play in the 2009 Rookie Challenge as a member of the Sophomore team.

In game 3 of the 76ers' 2009 opening round playoff series against the Orlando Magic, Young made a game-winning shot with 2 seconds remaining to give Philadelphia a 2 games to 1 lead.

On March 7, 2010, Young recorded a career high 32 points in a 114–101 win over the Toronto Raptors.

On February 21, 2014, Young set a career high with 29 field goal attempts, going on to record 30 points, 13 rebounds, 6 assists and 7 steals in a 112–124 loss to the Dallas Mavericks.

Young finished the 2013–14 NBA season with career highs in points, steals, assists, three-pointers made, and games started. He also finished the season third in the league in steals.

Minnesota Timberwolves (2014–2015)
On August 23, 2014, a three-team trade was completed involving the 76ers, the Minnesota Timberwolves, and the Cleveland Cavaliers. As part of the deal, Young was traded to the Wolves, along with Andrew Wiggins and Anthony Bennett, both then of the Cavaliers. The Cavaliers received Kevin Love from Minnesota, whereas the 76ers received Luc Mbah a Moute and Alexey Shved from Minnesota and a 2015 first round draft pick from Cleveland.

Brooklyn Nets (2015–2016)
On February 19, 2015, Young was traded to the Brooklyn Nets in exchange for Kevin Garnett. On June 22, 2015, Young opted out of his contract with the Nets to become a free agent. On July 9, 2015, he re-signed with the Nets. On February 3, 2016, he recorded 16 points and 14 rebounds against the Indiana Pacers, setting a new single-season career high with his 22nd double-double.

Indiana Pacers (2016–2019)
On July 7, 2016, Young was traded to the Indiana Pacers in exchange for the draft rights to Caris LeVert. On November 23, 2016, he scored a season-high 24 points against the Atlanta Hawks. On December 10, 2016, he scored 24 points and hit a career-high six 3-pointers in a 118–111 win over the Portland Trail Blazers.

On November 1, 2017, Young scored a season-high 26 points against the Cleveland Cavaliers.

On December 17, 2018, Young was named Eastern Conference Player of the Week for Week 9 of the 2018–19 season, marking his second career Eastern Conference Player of the Week award and his first honor since January 2014 when he was a member of the Philadelphia 76ers.

On January 17, 2019, Young scored a season-high 27 points in a 120–96 loss to the Philadelphia 76ers.

Chicago Bulls (2019–2021)
On July 6, 2019, Young signed with the Chicago Bulls as a free agent. Following a mediocre first season where Young struggled from the field, the veteran played better and more effectively during his second season with the Chicago Bulls, with strong inside play combined with good shooting from the field, good defense and strong all around abilities. Partly, the power forward was even a starter for the Bulls.

San Antonio Spurs (2021–2022) 
On August 11, 2021, Young, Al-Farouq Aminu, and several draft picks were traded to the San Antonio Spurs in exchange for DeMar DeRozan.

Toronto Raptors (2022–present) 
On February 10, 2022, Young, Drew Eubanks, and a 2022 second round selection were traded to the Toronto Raptors in exchange for Goran Dragić and a 2022 first-round draft selection. On June 30, Young signed a two-year, $16 million contract extension with the Raptors.

Career statistics

NBA

Regular season

|-
| style="text-align:left;"| 
| style="text-align:left;"| Philadelphia
| 74 || 22 || 21.0 || .539 || .316 || .738 || 4.2 || .8 || 1.0 || .1 || 8.2
|-
| style="text-align:left;"| 
| style="text-align:left;"| Philadelphia
| 75 || 71 || 34.4 || .495 || .341 || .735 || 5.0 || 1.1 || 1.3 || .3 || 15.3
|-
| style="text-align:left;"| 
| style="text-align:left;"| Philadelphia
| 67 || 45 || 32.0 || .470 || .348 || .691 || 5.2 || 1.4 || 1.2 || .2 || 13.8
|-
| style="text-align:left;"| 
| style="text-align:left;"| Philadelphia
| 82 || 1 || 26.1 || .541 || .273 || .707 || 5.3 || 1.0 || 1.1 || .3 || 12.7
|-
| style="text-align:left;"| 
| style="text-align:left;"| Philadelphia
| 63 || 1 || 27.9 || .507 || .250 || .771 || 5.2 || 1.2 || 1.0 || .7 || 12.8
|-
| style="text-align:left;"| 
| style="text-align:left;"| Philadelphia
| 76 || 76 || 34.6 || .531 || .125 || .574 || 7.5 || 1.6 || 1.8 || .7 || 14.8
|-
| style="text-align:left;"| 
| style="text-align:left;"| Philadelphia
| 79 || 78 || 34.4 || .454 || .308 || .712 || 6.0 || 2.3 || 2.1 || .5 || 17.9
|-
| rowspan=2 style="text-align:left;"| 
| style="text-align:left;"| Minnesota
| 48 || 48 || 33.4 || .451 || .292 || .682 || 5.1 || 2.8 || 1.8 || .4 || 14.3
|-
| style="text-align:left;"| Brooklyn
| 28 || 20 || 29.6 || .495 || .380 || .606 || 5.9 || 1.4 || 1.4 || .3 || 13.8
|-
| style="text-align:left;"| 
| style="text-align:left;"| Brooklyn
| 73 || 73 || 33.0 || .514 || .233 || .644 || 9.0 || 1.8 || 1.5 || .5 || 15.1
|-
| style="text-align:left;"| 
| style="text-align:left;"| Indiana
| 74 || 74 || 30.2 || .527 || .381 || .523 || 6.1 || 1.6 || 1.5 || .4 || 11.0
|-
| style="text-align:left;"| 
| style="text-align:left;"| Indiana
| 81 || 81 || 32.2 || .487 || .320 || .598 || 6.3 || 1.9 || 1.7 || .4 || 11.8
|-
| style="text-align:left;"| 
| style="text-align:left;"| Indiana
| 81 || 81 || 30.7 || .527 || .349 || .644 || 6.5 || 2.5 || 1.5 || .4 || 12.6
|-
| style="text-align:left;"| 
| style="text-align:left;"| Chicago
| 64 || 16 || 24.9 || .448 || .356 || .583 || 4.9 || 1.8 || 1.4 || .4 || 10.3
|-
| style="text-align:left;"| 
| style="text-align:left;"| Chicago
| 68 || 23 || 24.3 || .559 || .267 || .628 || 6.2 || 4.3 || 1.1 || .6 || 12.1
|-
| rowspan=2 style="text-align:left;"| 
| style="text-align:left;"| San Antonio
| 26 || 1 || 14.2 || .578 || .000 || .455 || 3.6 || 2.3 || .9 || .3 || 6.1
|-
| style="text-align:left;"| Toronto
| 26 || 0 || 18.3 || .465 || .395 || .481 || 4.4 || 1.7 || 1.2 || .4 || 6.3
|- class="sortbottom"
| style="text-align:center;" colspan="2"| Career
| 1,085 || 711 || 29.3 || .502 || .332 || .663 || 5.8 || 1.8 || 1.4 || .4 || 12.8

Playoffs

|-
| style="text-align:left;"| 2008
| style="text-align:left;"| Philadelphia
| 6 || 6 || 26.7 || .480 || .200 || .857 || 4.5 || .7 || 1.2 || .0 || 10.2
|-
| style="text-align:left;"| 2009
| style="text-align:left;"| Philadelphia
| 6 || 6 || 38.2 || .449 || .417 || .833 || 4.5 || 1.3 || 1.0 || .2 || 12.0
|-
| style="text-align:left;"| 2011
| style="text-align:left;"| Philadelphia
| 5 || 0 || 25.4 || .417 || .000 || .583 || 5.8 || .8 || .8 || .2 || 11.4
|-
| style="text-align:left;"| 2012
| style="text-align:left;"| Philadelphia
| 13 || 0 || 21.3 || .429 || – || .710 || 5.2 || 1.2 || .5 || .5 || 7.7
|-
| style="text-align:left;"| 2015
| style="text-align:left;"| Brooklyn
| 6 || 6 || 31.7 || .439 || .000 || .417 || 7.2 || 2.7 || .8 || .2 || 10.5
|-
| style="text-align:left;"| 2017
| style="text-align:left;"| Indiana
| 4 || 4 || 35.0 || .538 || .250 || .500 || 9.0 || 2.5 || 2.0 || .3 || 12.0
|-
| style="text-align:left;"| 2018
| style="text-align:left;"| Indiana
| 7 || 7 || 33.9 || .600 || .286 || .385 || 7.7 || 1.4 || 1.7 || .9 || 11.3
|-
| style="text-align:left;"| 2019
| style="text-align:left;"| Indiana
| 4 || 4 || 32.5 || .429 || .250 || .571 || 7.0 || 3.8 || 2.8 || .8 || 10.5
|-
| style="text-align:left;"| 2022
| style="text-align:left;"| Toronto
| 6 || 0 || 14.5 || .500 || .143 || .250 || 3.0 || 1.7 || .8 || .2 || 3.3
|- class="sortbottom"
| style="text-align:center;" colspan="2"| Career
| 57 || 33 || 27.7 || .468 || .250 || .606 || 5.8 || 1.6 || 1.1 || .4 || 9.5

College

|-
| style="text-align:left;"| 2006–07
| style="text-align:left;"| Georgia Tech
| 31 || 31 || 29.6 || .478 || .419 || .749 || 4.9 || 2.0 || 1.3 || .4 || 14.4

Personal life
Young and his wife, Shekinah Beckett, have two sons named Thaddeus, Jr. and Taylor.

In May 2011, Young started a foundation called Young for Youth to help at-risk youth and young families.

Young's mother, Lula Hall, died on November 13, 2014, after an 18-month battle with breast cancer; she was 57 years old.

See also

 List of National Basketball Association career steals leaders
 2006 high school boys basketball All-Americans
 2006–07 Georgia Tech Yellow Jackets men's basketball team

References

External links

1988 births
Living people
20th-century African-American people
21st-century African-American sportspeople
African-American basketball players
American expatriate basketball people in Canada
American men's basketball players
Basketball players from New Orleans
Basketball players from Memphis, Tennessee
Brooklyn Nets players
Chicago Bulls players
Georgia Tech Yellow Jackets men's basketball players
Indiana Pacers players
McDonald's High School All-Americans
Minnesota Timberwolves players
Parade High School All-Americans (boys' basketball)
Philadelphia 76ers draft picks
Philadelphia 76ers players
Power forwards (basketball)
San Antonio Spurs players
Toronto Raptors players